Jannik Sinner was the defending champion but chose not to defend his title.

Ilya Ivashka won the title after defeating Antoine Hoang 6–4, 3–6, 7–6(7–3) in the final.

Seeds

Draw

Finals

Top half

Bottom half

References

External links
Main draw
Qualifying draw

Sparkassen ATP Challenger - Singles
2020 Singles